The UNLV Arboretum is an  arboretum on the campus of the University of Nevada, Las Vegas in Paradise, Nevada.

The arboretum was established in 1985, and includes all of the landscaped areas of the entire  campus. The arboretum's missions are to display mature plants suited for high desert conditions, and to investigate new plants and cultivars. The arboretum also includes a  Xeric Garden, established in 1988 and located at the entrance to the Marjorie Barrick Museum, which contains plants from arid regions from around the world.

See also
 List of botanical gardens in the United States

References

External links
 UNLV Arboretum

Arboreta in Nevada
Botanical gardens in Nevada
Buildings and structures in Paradise, Nevada
Protected areas of Clark County, Nevada
Arboretum